The House of Gadi was a dynasty of kings of the Northern Kingdom of Israel. The dynasty is also called the House of Menahem, after its founder. The dynasty lasted for only twelve years and ruled from Israel's then-capital of Samaria. The dynasty is so named because Menahem was the son of Gadi. Some have speculated that Gadi was a scion of the tribe of Gad.

Two kings of Israel came from the dynasty - Menahem and Pekahiah. Menahem became king of Israel in the thirty-ninth year of the reign of Azariah, king of Judah. He reigned in Israel for ten years. He was succeeded by his son Pekahiah. Pekahiah became king in the fiftieth year of Azariah's reign.

After a reign of two years, Pekahiah was assassinated by Pekah ben Remaliah - a captain from his own army - with the help of fifty men from Gilead. Pekah succeeded Pekahiah as king. Pekah's dynasty is known as the House of Remaliah.

References

See also
 History of ancient Israel and Judah
 House of Baasha
 House of Jehu
 House of Jeroboam
 House of Zimri
 Omride Dynasty

 
Kings of ancient Israel
Gilead